The Capay Valley AVA is an American Viticultural Area located in the Capay Valley, in northwest Yolo County, California.

The  region included in the AVA borders Napa County, Lake County, and Colusa County, and is bounded by the Blue Ridge to the west and the Capay Hills to the east.

The AVA was created as a result of a petition by Capay Valley Vineyards, the largest winery in the valley.

John Gillig purchased part of the Rancho Canada de Capay Mexican land grant and established Yolo County's first winery in 1860.

References 

Geography of Yolo County, California
American Viticultural Areas of California
American Viticultural Areas
2002 establishments in California